The Leonard Gordon Homestead, Hexagonal Grain Crib is a historic farm outbuilding in rural White County, Arkansas.  It is located off County Road 69, north of Bald Knob.  It is a single-story wood-frame structure, finished in board and batten siding and topped by a hexagonal hip roof.  It exhibits a high quality of craftsmanship in the mitering of its structural members, suggesting it was intended to be a visually striking structure.  Built about 1920, it is the only hexagonal structure identified in an architectural survey of the county.

The structure was listed on the National Register of Historic Places in 1992, and was delisted in 2017.

See also
National Register of Historic Places listings in White County, Arkansas

References

Agricultural buildings and structures on the National Register of Historic Places in Arkansas
Buildings and structures completed in 1920
National Register of Historic Places in White County, Arkansas
Former National Register of Historic Places in Arkansas
1920 establishments in Arkansas
Hexagonal buildings